The city of Ottawa, Canada held municipal elections on December 4, 1972.

Controller Pierre Benoit is easily elected without significant opposition. Ottawa's city council is divided in two, as this marks the first election where only one alderman is elected from each ward, as opposed to two.

Mayor of Ottawa

Ottawa Board of Control
(4 elected)
859/861 polls reporting

City council

*Official results published on December 7. A recount held on December 27 indicated Robert had only won by 12 votes.

References

Ottawa Journal, December 5, 1972

Municipal elections in Ottawa
1972 elections in Canada
1970s in Ottawa
1972 in Ontario
December 1972 events in Canada